Hrasnica is an urban neighborhood in the municipality of Ilidza, Sarajevo Canton, Federation of Bosnia and Herzegovina. According to the 1991 Yugoslav census, it had a population of over 12 thousand inhabitants, divided in two administrative areas, Hrasnica 1 and Hrasnica 2.

References

See also 
 List of cities in Bosnia and Herzegovina
 Municipalities of Bosnia and Herzegovina

Populated places in Ilidža